"Stay" is a non-album single by Nick Jonas & the Administration. The song didn't appear on their first album Who I Am.

Background and composition
"Stay" "is a song Nick wrote when he had a day off in Washington
It came after some things that I was going through that really inspired it. and I'm just in a good place right now and was able to get a song out of it, which is always nice."

On 6 January Nick said about the song on Twitter:

In 2010, the song was nominated for a Teen Choice Award in the category Choice Music: Love Song.

Release
On 2 March 2010 they released the song "Stay" as a digital single and a digital EP.
Nick said that the song won't be on their first record because he wrote it too late to add it.
The digital single/ Digital EP of "Stay" contains only the live version of the song.
Another live version of the song was recorded on 28 January at the wiltern theater in Los Angeles.
On 11 May 2010 it the song was used on the live album: Nick Jonas & The Administration Live at the Wiltern January 28th, 2010.

Track listing

Other versions
 "Stay" (live) – 7:51

Music video
The basis of the video is a live performance of the song at the Wiltern theater during the Who I Am Tour.
The video was released on the EP of Stay; which was released on 2 March 2010 as a digital download on iTunes.

Live performances
Nick Jonas performed the song live for the first time on 6 January during the Who I Am Tour with the Administration.
On 29 August 2010 he performed "Stay" on tour during a concert in Virginia Beach which was a part of the Jonas Brothers Live In Concert Tour.

On 23 February 2011 Nick performed the song during an acoustic set, accompanied by Jonas Brothers guitarist John Taylor.
On 1 July, Nick performed the song live during the Microsoft Store Grand Opening in Century City.
They performed the song on 16 July, during the Ottawa Blues fest.
The song was also performed during the concerts of Nick Jonas & the Administration in South America.

The song was performed during the concert in Mexico of the Jonas Brothers World Tour 2012/2013. Stay was performed again in Rio de Janeiro on 12 March 2013.
The song was performed again on 29 July during  the Jonas Brothers Live Tour.

Personnel
 Nick Jonas - lead vocals, lead guitar, composer
 Tommy Barbarella - keyboards
 Michael Bland - drums, vibraphone, vocals
 Sonny Thompson - guitars, vocals
 John Fields - bass, guitars, percussion, producer, vibraphone
 Dave McNair - mastering
 Jon Lind - A&R
 David Snow - creative director
 Enny Joo - art direction
 Olaf Heine - photography
 Paul David Hager - mixing
 Philip McIntyre - management
 Johnny Wright - management
 Kevin Jonas, Sr. - management

Release History

References

2010 singles
Nick Jonas & the Administration songs
Songs written by Nick Jonas
Hollywood Records singles
2010 songs